David Mikael William Veale  is a British psychiatrist. He is a visiting professor in cognitive behavioural psychotherapies at the Institute of Psychiatry, Psychology and Neuroscience, King's College London and a consultant psychiatrist at the South London and Maudsley NHS Foundation Trust. He has conducted a range of clinical research, especially in body dysmorphic disorder, obsessive–compulsive disorder, emetophobia, and depression.

Research work
	 
His main clinical expertise is in treatment of obsessive–compulsive disorder, body dysmorphic disorder (BDD), emetophobia and depression. He has developed and evaluated protocols for BDD and emetophobia that are used by other cognitive behaviour therapists (CBT).
	 
He is the first author or been a co-author on the first randomized controlled trial (RCT) on CBT v a wait list in body dysmorphic disorder (Veale et al., 1996); the first RCT on CBT v anxiety management control in BDD (Veale et al., 2010); the first RCT on CBT for BDD in adolescence (Mataix-Cols, 2015); the first RCT on CBT for emetophobia (Riddle-Walker et al., 2016) and the first RCT on triple chronotherapy in out-patients with depression (Veale et al. 2021).

Publications

Books 
Keyes, A.; Veale, D. (2021). Free Yourself from Emetophobia: A CBT Self-Help Guide for a Fear of Vomiting. Jessica Kingsley Publishers.
Veale, D.; Neziroglu, F. (2010). Body Dysmorphic Disorder: A Treatment Manual. John Wiley & Sons. doi:10.1002/9780470684610. ISBN 9780470684610.
Veale, D.; Willson, R. (2005). Overcoming Obsessive Compulsive Disorder. Robinson.

Selected Journal articles 
Riddle-Waker, L.; Veale, D. (2016). "Cognitive behaviour therapy for a specific phobia of vomiting (emetophobia): a pilot randomized controlled trial". Journal of Anxiety Disorders. 43: 14–22. doi:10.1016/j.janxdis.2016.07.005. PMID 27472452.
Veale, D. (1996). "Body Dysmorphic Disorder: a cognitive behavioural model and a pilot randomised controlled trial". Behaviour Research and Therapy. 34 (9): 717–729. doi:10.1016/0005-7967(96)00025-3. PMID 8936754.
Veale, D. (2014). "Efficacy of Cognitive Behaviour Therapy versus Anxiety Management for Body Dysmorphic Disorder: A Randomized Controlled Trial". Psychotherapy and Psychosomatics. 83 (6): 341–353. doi:10.1159/000360740. PMID 25323062. S2CID 3221449.
Veale, D. (2021). "A preliminary investigation of a novel method to manipulate penis length to measure female sexual satisfaction: a single case experimental design". BJU International. n/a (n/a). doi:10.1111/bju.15416. PMID 33793040. S2CID 232482227.

References

External links
 

British psychiatrists
Year of birth missing (living people)
Living people